Terence James George "Terry" Smith (18 October 1932 – 11 September 2021) was a British sailor. He won a bronze medal in the Sharpie class  with Jasper Blackall at the 1956 Summer Olympics.

References

Mention of Terence Smith's death

1932 births
2021 deaths
British male sailors (sport)
Olympic sailors of Great Britain
Sailors at the 1956 Summer Olympics – 12 m2 Sharpie
Olympic bronze medallists for Great Britain
Olympic medalists in sailing
Medalists at the 1956 Summer Olympics